Vladimir Aceti (born 16 October 1998) is an Italian sprinter, specialized in the 400 metres. He competed at the 2020 Summer Olympics, in 4 × 400 m relay.

Biography
From Russian origins adopted when he was 5 by an Italian family.

His first club was Atletica Vis Nova of Giussano. On 27 May 2017, he established his personal best in Oordegem at 46.30, the second best ever for an Italian junior. On 2 July 2017, he finished second during Italian Championships in Trieste, with 46.40. On 22 July 2017, he established the New Junior National Record, winning the gold medal at 2017 European Championships U20 in Grosseto, and also the gold medal in the race of 4x400 m (WU20L).

Achievements

National titles
 Italian Athletics Indoor Championships
 400 metres: 2021

See also
 Italian national track relay team

References

External links
 

1998 births
Athletics competitors of Fiamme Gialle
Italian male sprinters
Living people
People from Petrozavodsk
Italian people of Russian descent
Russian adoptees
Athletes (track and field) at the 2020 Summer Olympics
Olympic athletes of Italy
21st-century Italian people